Lambourn is a surname. Notable people with the surname include:

Arthur Lambourn (1910–1999), New Zealand rugby union player
George Lambourn (1900–1977), British artist

See also
 Lamborn, a surname
 Laybourn